Vergílio António Ferreira, JOSE (Melo, Gouveia, 28 January 1916 – Lisbon, 1 March 1996) was a Portuguese writer, essayist, professor and a key figure in Portuguese-language literature. His prolific literary output, comprising works of fiction (novels, short-stories and novellas), philosophical essays and literary diaries, are generally divided into neorealism, dominant in Portuguese fiction at the time, and existentialism.

In 1992, Ferreira was awarded the Camões Prize, a literary prize that seeks to distinguish the great names of Portuguese-language literature.  His name remains linked to Portuguese literature through the annual attribution of the Literary Prize Vergílio Ferreira by the Municipality of Gouveia.

Biography
Ferreira entered a seminary at the age of 10 and left when he was 16. Later he studied at the University of Coimbra. His experiences are related in his most famous work Manhã Submersa (Misty Morning, lit. Submerged Morning), which was published in 1953 and made into a film in 1980. Among his best novels is also Aparição (1959).

He worked most of his life as a teacher in several places around Portugal.

dedão

Works

Fiction 

 1938 A curva de uma vida (posthumous)
 1943 O Caminho Fica Longe 
 1944 Onde Tudo Foi Morrendo
 1946 Vagão "J"
 1947 Promessa 
 1949 Mudança
 1954 Manhã Submersa
 1959 Aparição
 1953 A Face Sangrenta
 1960 Cântico Final
 1962 Estrela Polar
 1963 Apelo da Noite
 1965 Alegria Breve
 1971 Nítido Nulo
 1971 Apenas Homens
 1974 Rápida, a Sombra
 1976 Contos
 1979 Signo Sinal
 1983 Para Sempre
 1986 Uma Esplanada Sobre o Mar
 1987 Até ao Fim
 1990 Em Nome da Terra
 1993 Na Tua Face
 1995 Do Impossível Repouso
 1996 Cartas a Sandra

 Essays 
 1943 Sobre o Humorismo de Eça de Queirós 1957 Do Mundo Original 1958 Carta ao Futuro 1963 Da Fenomenologia a Sartre 1963 Interrogação ao Destino, Malraux 1965 Espaço do Invisível I 1969 Invocação ao Meu Corpo 1976 Espaço do Invisível II 1977 Espaço do Invisível III 1981 Um Escritor Apresenta-se 1987 Espaço do Invisível IV 1988 Arte Tempo 1998 Espaço do Invisível V (posthumous)

 Diaries 
 1980 Conta-Corrente I 1981 Conta-Corrente II 1983 Conta-Corrente III 1986 Conta-Corrente IV 1987 Conta-Corrente V 1992 Pensar 1993 Conta-Corrente-nova série I 1993 Conta-Corrente-nova série II 1994 Conta-Corrente-nova série III 1994 Conta-Corrente-nova série IV 2001 Escrever (posthumous)
 2010 Diário Inédito'' (posthumous)

References

1916 births
1996 deaths
People from Gouveia, Portugal
Portuguese male novelists
Portuguese agnostics
University of Coimbra alumni
Prix Femina Étranger winners
Camões Prize winners
20th-century novelists
20th-century Portuguese writers
20th-century male writers